José Joaquín de Herrera is one of the 81 municipalities of Guerrero, in south-western Mexico. The municipal seat lies at Hueycantenango.

As of 2005, the municipality had a total population of 14,424.

References

Municipalities of Guerrero